Aisin Gioro Jidu (1633–1660) was Qing dynasty imperial prince as the second son of Jirgalang, Nurhaci's nephew. Jidu was the second holder of Prince Zheng title under the name "Prince Jian of the First Rank". The previous name was restored only in 1778.

Life 
Jidu was born to lady Gurhas, third primary princess consort Zhengxian of the First Rank.

Political career
Jidu's active political career started after the death of Dorgon in 1651. It was said that Shunzhi Emperor deeply despised Dorgon for breaking ancestor's rules and wanted to dismiss the regents. Jidu opposed the idea by claiming that he is faithful and could attend to the affairs as prince regent.

His father largely contributed to purging the court of Dorgon's supporters, including Ajige, who might have succeeded his brother as prince regent. Jidu was appointed as one of the regents upon the underage Shunzhi Emperor together with Ledu, Duoni (Dodo's son and successor), Yolo (Abatai's son), Dulan (Sahaliyan's son), Shangshan (Feiyangwu's son) and Du'erhu (Cuyen's grandson).  At that time, he became an heir apparent to Prince Zheng peerage. In 1655, Jidu was instated as a Dingyuan general, leading Manchu forces to defeat Koxinga. In 1656, Jidu's army suffered a defeat near Kinmen due to storm, losing most of naval forces.Koxinga was finally defeated in Nanjing. In 1657, when Jidu triumphally returned to the capital, he was informed about the funeral of his father and promoted to the prince of the first rank.

Death and legacy
Jidu died in 1660 and was succeeded by his third son, Desai. Jidu's military achievements were acknowledged by the Shunzhi Emperor, who did not only honour him with the title Prince Jianchun of the First Rank (简纯亲王), but had his memorial tablet placed in the adjacent shrine to the mausoleum of Hong Taiji. Jidu's legacy was continued by Labu, who was one of the Ming defectors in the early Kangxi era.

Tomb
Jidu is interred in the separate tomb on the western side of Prince Min mausoleum. Both mausoleums lay next to Jirhalang's tomb.

Family 
Jidu was married to lady Borjigin, daughter of Chorji and biological sister of Empress Xiaohuizhang (Alatan Qiqige).

 Primary consort, of the Khorchin Borjigin clan (嫡福晋科尔沁博尔济吉特氏)
 Desai, Prince Jianhui of the First Rank (简惠亲王德赛,1654-1670), third son
Princess Duanmin of the First Rank (端敏固伦公主, 1653–1729), first daughter
Married Bandi (班第) of the Khorchin Borjigin clan in 1670 and had issue (two sons)
 Secondary consort, of the Oirat Borjigin clan (侧福晋吴鲁特博尔济吉特氏)
 Secondary consort, of the Borjigin clan (侧福晋博尔济吉特氏)
 Mistress, of the Esaili clan (庶福晋额赛礼氏)
 Bulwark General Momei (墨美,1652-1691), first son
 Mujina (穆济纳,1657-1660), fourth son
 Mistress, of the Hang clan (庶福晋杭氏)
 Labu, Prince Jian of the First Rank (喇布,1654-1682), second son
 Yabu, Prince Jianxiu of the First Rank  (雅布,1658-1701), fifth son
 Mistress, of the Tong clan (庶福晋佟氏)

References

Further reading 

Qing dynasty imperial princes
Prince Zheng
1633 births
1660 deaths